C change is a waterproof and windproof temperature adaptive material developed and produced by Schoeller Textiles.

The material contains a membrane layer which is set to a predetermined temperature range. Once the climate inside the garment warms (due to physical exertion or higher ambient temperatures), the polymer membrane structure opens up to allow water vapour to escape through the membrane. As the temperature falls, the membrane closes to its original structure, preserving body heat. This is inspired by pine cones which open and close in response to changes in ambient temperature, and can be regarded as an example of biomimicry.

The fabric won the 2006 Frost & Sullivan Award for Product Innovation of the Year.

References

External links
 Schoeller textiles home page

Technical fabrics
Brand name materials